L’Invisible is a 2017 opera by Aribert Reimann. The French libretto by Reimann is a condensation of three short plays by Maurice Maeterlinck;  L'Intruse, Intérieur and La Mort de Tintagiles, into a single act opera. The "invisible" in each part is death, first as a supernatural force, then as tragic news, then in the person of a murderous queen.

Recording
 Rachel Harnisch (Ursula/Marie/Ygraine), Annika Schlicht (Marthe/Bellangère), Ronnita Miller (Handmaiden), Stephen Bronk (Grandfather/An old man/Aglovale), Thomas Blondelle (Uncle/Stranger), Tim Severloh, Matthew Shaw, Martin Wölfel (Drei Dienerinnen) Das Orchester der Deutschen Oper Berlin, Donald Runnicles Oehms. 2018

References

 

2017 operas
Operas by Aribert Reimann
Operas
Operas based on plays
Operas based on works by Maurice Maeterlinck